The 2021–22 Bangalore Super Division season was the 19th season of the Bangalore Super Division, the fourth tier league in Indian football system, and Karnataka's top-tier football league. Bengaluru United were the defending champions.

Changes from last season

Relegated to A Division
 Income Tax FC

Promoted from A Division
 Kodagu FC
 Jawahar Union
 Bangalore United FC

Regular season

League table

Statistics

Top scorers

Hat-tricks

Clean sheets

See also
2021–22 season in state football leagues of India
2021–22 Chennai Senior Division
2021–22 Kerala Premier League

References

Bangalore Super Division seasons
2021–22 in Indian football leagues
2021–22 in Indian football